Yurkovskaya is a rural locality (a village) in Nizhneslobodskoye Rural Settlement, Vozhegodsky District, Vologda Oblast, Russia. The population was 18 as of 2002.

Geography 
Yurkovskaya is located 50 km east of Vozhega (the district's administrative centre) by road. Todelovskaya is the nearest rural locality.

References 

Rural localities in Vozhegodsky District